Silvia Solar (20 March 19369 May 2011) was a French actress and prolific minor star in Spanish cinema. The majority of her appearances were in the 1960s and 1970s.

Early life
Solar was born Geneviève Couzain in Paris.

Career

Couzain won the title of "Miss France" at age 16.   Shortly thereafter producer and director Henri Diamant-Berger cast Solar in her first film role. 

Her career spanned from the late 1950s through the early 1990s, starring in dozens of comedies, romances, drama, crime and spy thrillers as well as horror films.  She played a main role in the Italian horror film Eyeball in 1975. That same year, she appeared alongside Paul Naschy in Night of the Howling Beast.  She starred in the film Devil's Kiss, which received mixed reviews.

Personal
Solar was married to actor and former bullfighter Rogelio Madrid. She died May 18, 2011 in Lloret de Mar, Spain.

Selected filmography

Les Lavandières du Portugal (1957)
Comme un cheveu sur la soupe (1957) - (uncredited)
C'est arrivé à 36 chandelles (1957) - Myra
Hoppla, jetzt kommt Eddie (1958) - Gonzales 2. Schwester
Los clarines del miedo (1958) - Fina
El emigrante (1960) - Rosario
Despedida de soltero (1961) - Carmen
Madame (1961) - Margot
Y el cuerpo sigue aguantando (1961)
Vampiresas 1930 (1962)
Operación Embajada (1963) - Coralito
Tela de araña (1963) - Rosa
The Fair of the Dove (1963) - Balbina
El precio de un asesino (1963) - Dana
Heroes of the West (1964) - Margaret
Gibraltar (1964) - Miriam
Weeping for a Bandit (1964) - Marquesa de los Cerros
Texas Ranger (1964) - Linda Ranson
Tomb of the Pistolero (1964) - Taffy
Vivir un largo invierno (1964) - Teresa
I due mafiosi (1964) - Clementine
Relevo para un pistolero (1964) - Carmen González
I due toreri (1964) - Margaret
El castillo de los monstruos (1964) - Pelusa
Man Called Gringo (1965) - Kate Rowland
Finger on the Trigger (1965) - Violet
Manhattan Night of Murder (1965) - Wilma de Loy
M.M.M. 83 (1965) - Janette
The Man from Interpol (1966) - Lydia
Pas de panique (1966) - Germaine
Agente Sigma 3 - Missione Goldwather (1967) - Catherine
Danger!! Death Ray (1967) - Mrs. Carver
La piel quemada (1967) - La turista belga
Mexican Slayride (1967) - Francine
Si muore solo una volta (1967) - Jane
Mr Dinamite (1967) - Natascha
Gentleman Killer (1967) - Vicky, Saloon Girl
Death and Diamonds (1968) - Lana
Sharon vestida de rojo (1969) - Carla
Agáchate, que disparan (1969) - Espía
La Lola, dicen que no vive sola (1970) - Nelly
La liga no es cosa de hombres (1972) - Colette Duval
Horror Story (1972) - Anuschka
Crimson (1973) - Ana
Las juergas de 'El Señorito''' (1973) - Mujer de ToniLa redada (1973) - RosarioBusco tonta para fin de semana (1973) - Empleada del hotelAborto criminal (1973) - CloLes enjambées (1974) - La doctoresseSerre-moi contre toi, j'ai besoin de caresses (1974) - Docteur CusterLa muerte llama a las 10 (1974) - Jackie PolianskiLa maison des filles perdues (1974) - SylviaLas correrías del Vizconde Arnau (1974) - Maria PiaChicas de alquiler (1974) - CarmenEl último proceso en París (1974) - Linda DexterLa Maldicion de la Bestia (1975) - WandesaEyeball (1975) - Gail AlvaradoRelación matrimonial y otras cosas (1975)Guapa, rica y... especial (1976) - Doctora RosalbaLa nueva Marilyn (1976) - HarrietteMauricio, mon amour (1976) - SusanDevil's Kiss (1976) - Claire GrandierUna prima en la bañera (1976) - Tía ElviraLas alegres chicas de 'El Molino' (1977) - MercheLas marginadas (1977) - María JoséLa máscara (1977) - Madre de Diana¿Y ahora qué, señor fiscal? (1977) - JuliaLos violadores del amanecer (1978) - Dana's AuntTrampa sexual (1978) - Madre de MaríaLas que empiezan a los quince años (1978) - Madre de Susi / Susi's MotherLa amante ingenua (1980)Un millón por tu historia (1980) - BertaCannibal Terror (1980) - Madame DanvilleViciosas al desnudo (1980) - MaríaBarcelona sur (1981) - MadameLos embarazados (1982) - TatianaEsas chicas tan pu... (1982) - MadameLos locos, locos carrozas (1984) - ClaraThe Cheerful Colsada Girls (1984)Últimas tardes con Teresa (1984)Crónica sentimental en rojo (1986) - Olvido MontalMás allá de la muerte (1986)Adela (1987) - ÁngelaSinatra (1988) - Mujer maduraMakinavaja, el último choriso'' (1992) - Radio Show Host

References 

 Tom Lisanti, Louis Paul: Film fatales: Women in Espionage Films and Television, 1962-1973. 2002, P. 274

External links 

 

1936 births
2011 deaths
20th-century French actresses
French expatriates in Spain